Loránd Győry (11 April 1871 – 30 July 1926) was a Hungarian politician, who served as Minister of Agriculture for few days in 1919. He was the son of Vilmos Győry, a Hungarian theologian.

References
 Magyar Életrajzi Lexikon

1871 births
1926 deaths
People from Orosháza
People from the Kingdom of Hungary
Hungarian Lutherans
Agriculture ministers of Hungary